Kenneth William Stevenson (9 November 1949 – 12 January 2011) was the eighth Bishop of Portsmouth in the Church of England.

Life
Stevenson was born in Edinburgh on 19 November 1949.  He was educated at Edinburgh Academy and the University of Edinburgh, taking his MA in 1970.  

Stevenson was consecrated as Bishop of Portsmouth in 1995, following parish work in Lincoln, Guildford, and in the university chaplaincy at the University of Manchester. He was married, with four children.

Stevenson held a PhD from the University of Southampton and a DD from the University of Manchester where he lectured in liturgy alongside his work as a chaplain. He was involved in the Church of England's participation in the Porvoo Communion, not least because he was part-Danish. He was a Knight Commander of the Kingdom of Denmark's Order of the Dannebrog. In 2006, having been diagnosed with leukemia, he began a course of treatment. On 22 February 2009 he announced at a service at Portsmouth Cathedral that he would retire in September 2009 due to continuing ill-health. He presided at his last confirmation service on 19 July 2009 at St Peter's Church Seaview, Isle of Wight. Stevenson commented in a statement:

"There is a sadness in the decision but I know that it is the right one. I did wrestle with it and it has proved to be the most difficult decision of my life. I have loved being your Bishop and  have never wanted to be Bishop of anywhere else."

In retirement, Stevenson continued to write and give his support to fund-raising activities for Leukaemia & Lymphoma Research, e.g. through musical events and the artistic work of his daughter Alexandra.

He had two brothers-in-law who were also bishops: David Tustin and Peter Forster. Both assisted at his funeral at Portsmouth Cathedral on 26 January 2011, along with his great friend Patricia Routledge.

Works
 The Catholic Apostolic Eucharist, PhD thesis, Southampton University, 1975
 The Lord's Prayer; A Text in Tradition, 2004

References

External links
 Archived copy of Kenneth Stevenson's former website with some of his speeches, sermons and writing during his time as Bishop of Portsmouth between 2004 and 2009 

1949 births
2011 deaths
Clergy from Edinburgh
People educated at Edinburgh Academy
Alumni of the University of Edinburgh
Bishops of Portsmouth (Anglican)
20th-century Church of England bishops
21st-century Church of England bishops
20th-century Scottish Episcopalian priests
Knights of the Order of the Dannebrog